The Whistleblower Protection Act of 1989, 5 U.S.C. 2302(b)(8)-(9), Pub.L. 101-12 as amended, is a United States federal law that protects federal whistleblowers who work for the government and report the possible existence of an activity constituting a violation of law, rules, or regulations, or mismanagement, gross waste of funds, abuse of authority or a substantial and specific danger to public health and safety. A federal agency violates the Whistleblower Protection Act if agency authorities take (or threaten to take) retaliatory personnel action against any employee or applicant because of disclosure of information by that employee or applicant.

Authorized federal agencies
 The Office of Special Counsel investigates federal whistleblower complaints. In October 2008, then-special counsel Scott Bloch resigned amid an FBI investigation into whether he obstructed justice by illegally deleting computer files following complaints that he had retaliated against employees who disagreed with his policies. Then-Senator Barack Obama made a campaign vow to appoint a special counsel committed to whistleblower rights. It was not until April 2011 that President Obama's appointee Carolyn Lerner was confirmed by the Senate. Today, the primary mission of OSC is to safeguard the merit system by protecting federal employees and applicants from prohibited personnel practices, especially reprisal for whistleblowing.
 The Merit Systems Protection Board, a quasi-judicial agency that adjudicates whistleblower complaints, uses appointed administrative law judges who often back the government. Since 2000, the board has ruled for whistleblowers just three times in 56 cases decided on their merits, according to a Government Accountability Project analysis. Obama appointed a new chairperson and vice chairperson with backgrounds as federal worker advocates, but Tom Devine of GAP says, "It's likely to take years for them to turn things around." Currently, this office works to protect the Merit System Principles and promote an effective Federal workforce free of Prohibited Personnel Practices.
 The Court of Appeals for the Federal Circuit was established under Article III of the Constitution on October 1, 1982. It is the only court empowered to hear appeals of whistleblower cases decided by the merit board. The Federal Circuit has been criticized by Senator Grassley (R-Iowa) and others in Congress for misinterpreting whistleblower laws and setting a precedent that is hostile to claimants. Between 1994 and 2010, the court had ruled for whistleblowers in only three of 203 cases decided on their merits, GAP's analysis found.

Legal cases
The U.S. Supreme Court, in the case of Garcetti v. Ceballos, 04-473, ruled in 2006 that government employees do not have protection from retaliation by their employers under the First Amendment of the Constitution when they speak pursuant to their official job duties.
The U.S. Merit Systems Protection Board (MSPB) uses agency lawyers in the place of administrative law judges to decide federal employees' whistleblower appeals. These lawyers, dubbed "attorney examiners," deny 98% of whistleblower appeals; the Board and the Federal Circuit Court of Appeals give great deference to their initial decisions, resulting in affirmance rates of 97% and 98%, respectively. The most common characteristics for a court claim that are encompassed within the protection of the Act include: that the plaintiff is an employee or person covered under the specific statutory or common law relied upon for action, that the defendant is an employer or person covered under the specific statutory or common law relied upon for the action, that the plaintiff engaged in protected whistleblower activity, that the defendant knew or had knowledge that the plaintiff engaged in such activity, that there was retaliatory action taken against the one doing the whistleblowing and that the unfair treatment would not have occurred if the plaintiff hadn't brought to attention the activities. Robert MacLean blew the whistle on the fact that the TSA had cut its funding for more air marshals. In 2009 MacLean, represented by the Government Accountability Project, challenged his dismissal at the Merit Systems Protection Board, on the grounds that "his disclosure of the text message was protected under the Whistleblower Protection Act of 1989, because he 'reasonably believe[d]' that the leaked information disclosed 'a substantial and specific danger to public health or safety'." MacLean won the case in a ruling of 7–2 in the Supreme Court in January 2015.

Whistleblower Protection Enhancement Act and Presidential Policy Directive 19

President Barack Obama issued Presidential Policy Directive 19 (PPD-19), entitled "Protecting Whistleblowers with Access to Classified Information". According to the directive signed by Obama on October 10, 2012, it is written that "this Presidential Policy Directive ensures that employees (1) serving in the Intelligence Community or (2) who are eligible for access to classified information can effectively report waste, fraud, and abuse while protecting classified
national security information. It prohibits retaliation against employees for reporting waste, fraud, and abuse.

However, according to a report that the Committee on Homeland Security and Governmental Affairs submitted to accompany S. 743, "the federal whistleblowers have seen their protections diminish in recent years, largely as a result of a series of decisions by the United States Court of Appeals for the Federal Circuit, which has exclusive jurisdiction over many cases brought under the Whistleblower Protection Act (WPA). Specifically, the Federal Circuit has accorded a narrow definition to the type of disclosure that qualifies for whistleblower protection. Additionally, the lack of remedies under current law for most whistleblowers in the intelligence community and for whistleblowers who face retaliation in the form of withdrawal of the employee's security clearance leaves unprotected those who are in a position to disclose wrongdoing that directly affects our national security."
S. 743 would address these problems by restoring the original congressional intent of the WPA to adequately protect whistleblowers, by strengthening the WPA, and by creating new whistleblower protections for intelligence employees and new protections for employees whose security clearance is withdrawn in retaliation for having made legitimate whistleblower disclosures. S. 743 ultimately became Pub.L. 112-199 (S.Rep. 112-155).

Related legislation

On July 14, 2014, the United States House of Representatives voted to pass the All Circuit Review Extension Act (H.R. 4197; 113th Congress), a bill that gives authority to federal employees who want to appeal their judgment to any federal court, and which allows whistleblowers to appeal to any U.S. Court of Appeals that has jurisdiction. The bill would extend from three years after the effective date of the Whistleblower Protection Enhancement Act of 2012 (i.e., December 27, 2012), the period allowed for: (1) filing a petition for judicial review of Merit Systems Protection Board decisions in whistleblower cases, and (2) any review of such a decision by the Director of the Office of Personnel Management (OPM).

See also

Whistleblower protection in United States
False Claims Act
Federal crime
Immunity from prosecution
Informant
List of whistleblowers
Military Whistleblower Protection Act
Qui tam
Testimony
Turn state's evidence
White collar crime
Witness
Witness intimidation
United States Federal Witness Protection Program
United States Marshals Service

References

External links
"Whistleblower Protection Act Information." U.S. Securities and Exchange Commission. January 30, 2004. Retrieved May 3, 2007
"File a Complaint (OSC.Gov)." U.S. Office of Special Counsel. Retrieved January 13, 2020

1989 in law
101st United States Congress
United States federal criminal legislation
Whistleblower protection legislation
Whistleblowing in the United States
United States federal labor legislation